OWM may refer to:
 Office of War Mobilization
 OpenWeatherMap